SS Cap Arcona, named after Cape Arkona on the island of Rügen, was a large German ocean liner, later a ship of the German Navy, and finally a prison ship. A flagship of the Hamburg Südamerikanische Dampfschifffahrts-Gesellschaft ("Hamburg-South America Line"), she made her maiden voyage on 29 October 1927, carrying passengers and cargo between Germany and the east coast of South America, and in her time was the largest and quickest ship on the route.

In 1940 the Kriegsmarine requisitioned Cap Arcona as an accommodation ship. In 1942 she served as the set for the German propaganda feature film Titanic. In 1945 she evacuated almost 26,000 German civilian refugees from East Prussia before the advance of the Red Army.

Cap Arconas final use was as a prison ship. This was one of the largest single-incident maritime losses of life in the Second World War.

Building and equipment
Blohm+Voss in Hamburg built Cap Arcona, launching and completing her in 1927.

She was driven by eight steam turbines, single-reduction geared to two propeller shafts. She had three funnels, and her passenger comforts included a full-size tennis court abaft her third funnel. The ship had at least 26 lifeboats, most of which were mounted in two tiers (see image).

Cap Arcona had modern navigation and communication equipment. She was equipped for submarine signalling which allowed a ship to hear acoustic signals from aids to navigation. She also had wireless direction finding equipment, and from 1934 she had an echo sounding device and a gyrocompass.

Peacetime service
Cap Arcona entered service in 1927, commencing her maiden voyage on Hamburg Süd's route to Buenos Aires 29 October. She joined the older liner  on the route, which had been Hamburg Süd's flagship until Cap Arconas completion. Cap Polonio was laid up in 1931 and scrapped in 1935, leaving Cap Arcona as Hamburg Süd's sole prestige ship on its South American route.

On 6 October 1932 Cap Arcona collided with the French cargo ship  in the North Sea off the Elbe 4 Lightship. Agen was beached, but later was refloated and escorted into Hamburg, Germany.

Accommodation ship
In 1940 the Kriegsmarine (German Navy) requisitioned Cap Arcona, had her painted overall grey and used her in the Baltic Sea as an accommodation ship in Gotenhafen (now Gdynia).

The production was completed, although the first director, Herbert Selpin, was arrested for disparaging remarks he made about Kriegsmarine sailors. His later self-destructive interrogation at the hands of propaganda minister Joseph Goebbels all but sealed his fate. He was found the next day hanged in his cell by his suspenders.

Evacuation of East Prussia
On 31 January 1945, the Kriegsmarine reactivated her for Operation Hannibal, where she was used to transport 25,795 German soldiers and civilians from East Prussia to safer areas in western Germany. By now these trips were made very dangerous by mines and Soviet Navy submarines. An estimated 9,400 people died. On 20 February, Cap Arconas captain, Johannes Gertz, shot himself in his cabin while berthed in Copenhagen rather than face another trip back to Gotenhafen.

On 30 March 1945, Cap Arcona finished her third and last trip between Gdynia and Copenhagen, carrying 9,000 soldiers and refugees. However, her turbines were completely worn out. They could only be partially repaired and her days of long-distance travel were over. She was decommissioned, returned to her owners Hamburg-Süd and ordered out of Copenhagen Harbour to Neustadt Bay.

Prison ship and sinking
During March and April 1945, concentration camp prisoners from Scandinavian countries had been transported from all over the Reich to the Neuengamme concentration camp near Hamburg, in the White Bus programme co-ordinated through the Swedish Red Crosswith prisoners of other nationalities displaced to make room for them. Eventually Heinrich Himmler agreed that these Scandinavians, and selected others regarded as less harmful to Germany, could be transported through Denmark to freedom in Sweden. Then between 16 and 28 April 1945, Neuengamme was systematically emptied of all its remaining prisoners, together with other groups of concentration camp inmates and Soviet POWs; with the intention that they would be relocated to a secret new camp, either on the Baltic island of Fehmarn; or at Mysen in Norway where preparations were put in hand to house them under the control of concentration camp guards evacuated from Sachsenhausen. Since the steering motors were out of use in Thielbek and the turbines were out of use in Cap Arcona, Athen was used to transfer prisoners from Lübeck to the larger ships and between ships; they were locked below decks and in the holds, and denied food and medical attention .

On 30 April 1945 the two Swedish ships Magdalena and Lillie Matthiessen, previously employed as support vessels for the White Bus evacuations, made a final rescue trip to Lübeck and back.  Amongst the prisoners rescued were some transferred from the prison flotilla. On the evening of 2 May 1945 more prisoners, mainly women and children from the Stutthof and Mittelbau-Dora camps were loaded onto barges and brought out to the anchored vessels; although, as the Cap Arcona refused to accept any more prisoners, over eight hundred were returned to the beach at Neustadt in the morning of 3 May, where around five hundred were killed in their barges by machine-gunning, or beaten to death on the beach, their SS guards then seeking to make their escape unencumbered.

The order to transfer the prisoners to the prison ships had come from Gauleiter Karl Kaufmann in Hamburg. Marc Buggeln has challenged Kaufmann's subsequent claim that he had been acting on orders from SS Headquarters in Berlin, arguing that the decision in fact resulted from political and business pressures from leading industrialists in Hamburg, who were already at this stage plotting with Kaufmann to hand the city over to British forces undefended and unharmed, and who consequently wished to whitewash away (literally so in the case of the Neuengamme concentration camp) all evidence for the prisoners' former presence within the city and its industries.

By early May however, any relocation plans had been scotched by the rapid British military advance to the Baltic; so the SS leadership, which had moved to Flensburg on 28 April, discussed scuttling the ships with the prisoners still aboard. Later, at a war crimes tribunal, Kaufmann claimed that the prisoners were intended to be sent to Sweden although, as none of the ships carried Red Cross hospital markings, nor were they seaworthy, this was scarcely credible. Georg-Henning Graf von Bassewitz-Behr, Hamburg's last Higher SS and Police Leader (HSSPF), testified at the same trial that the prisoners were in fact to be killed "in compliance with Himmler's orders". Kurt Rickert, who had worked for Bassewitz-Behr, testified at the Hamburg War Crimes Trial that he believed the ships were to be sunk by U-boats or Luftwaffe aircraft. Eva Neurath, who was present in Neustadt, and whose husband survived the disaster, said she was told by a police officer that the ships held convicts and were going to be blown up.

On 2 May 1945, the British Second Army discovered the empty camp at Neuengamme, and reached the towns of Lübeck and Wismar. No. 6 Commando, 1st Special Service Brigade commanded by Brigadier Derek Mills-Roberts, and 11th Armoured Division, commanded by Major-General Philip Roberts, entered Lübeck without resistance. Lübeck contained a permanent Red Cross office in its function as a Red Cross port, and Mr. De Blonay of the International Committee of the Red Cross informed Major-General Roberts that 7,000–8,000 prisoners were aboard ships in the Bay of Lübeck.
In the afternoon of 3 May 1945, the British 5th reconnaissance regiment advanced northwards to Neustadt, witnessing the ships burning in the bay and rescuing some severely emaciated prisoners on the beach at Neustadt, but otherwise finding mostly the bodies of women and children who had died that morning.

Locations
Cap Arcona: 
Thielbek: 
Deutschland: 
Athen
Elmenhorst

Sinking
On 3 May 1945, three days after Hitler's suicide and only one day before the unconditional surrender of the German troops in northwestern Germany at Lüneburg Heath to Field Marshal Montgomery, Cap Arcona, Thielbek, and the passenger liner Deutschland were attacked as part of general strikes on shipping in the Baltic Sea by Royal Air Force (RAF) Hawker Typhoons of 83 Group of the 2nd Tactical Air Force. Through Ultra Intelligence, the Western Allies had become aware that most of the SS leadership and former concentration camp commandants had gathered with Heinrich Himmler in Flensburg, hoping to contrive an escape to Norway. The western allies had intercepted orders from the rump Dönitz government, also at Flensburg, that the SS leadership were to be facilitated in escaping Allied captureor otherwise issued with false naval uniforms to conceal their identitiesas Dönitz sought, while surrendering, to maintain the fiction that his administration had been free from involvement in the camps, or in Hitler's policies of genocide.

The aircraft were from No. 184 Squadron, No. 193 Squadron, No. 263 Squadron, No. 197 Squadron RAF, and No. 198 Squadron. Besides four 20 mm cannon, these Hawker Typhoon Mark 1B fighter-bombers carried either eight HE "60-lb" RP-3 unguided rockets or two  bombs.

None of the prison flotilla were Red Cross marked (although the Deutschland had previously been intended as a hospital ship, and retained one white painted funnel with a red cross), and all prisoners were concealed below deck, so the pilots in the attacking force were unaware that they were laden with concentration camp survivors. Although Swedish and Swiss Red Cross officials had informed British intelligence on 2 May 1945 of the presence of large numbers of prisoners on ships at anchor in Lübeck Bay, this vital information was not passed on. The RAF commanders ordering the strike believed that a flotilla of ships was being prepared in Lübeck Bay, to accommodate leading SS personnel fleeing to German-controlled Norway in accordance with Dönitz's orders. "The ships are gathering in the area of Lübeck and Kiel. At SHAEF it is believed that important Nazis who have escaped from Berlin to Flensburg are onboard, and are fleeing to Norway or neutral countries".

Equipped with lifejackets from locked storage compartments, most of the SS guards managed to jump overboard from Cap Arcona. German trawlers sent to rescue Cap Arconas crew members and guards managed to save 16 sailors, 400 SS men, and 20 SS women. Only 350 of the 5,000 former concentration camp inmates aboard Cap Arcona survived. From 2,800 prisoners on board the Thielbek only 50 were saved; whereas all 2,000 prisoners on the Deutschland  were safely taken off onto the Athen, before the Deutschland capsized.

RAF Pilot Allan Wyse of No. 193 Squadron recalled, "We used our cannon fire at the chaps in the water... we shot them up with 20 mm cannons in the water. Horrible thing, but we were told to do it and we did it. That's war."

Severely damaged and set on fire, Cap Arcona eventually capsized. Photos of the burning ships, listed as Deutschland, Thielbek, and Cap Arcona, and of the emaciated survivors swimming in the very cold Baltic Sea, around 7 °C (44.6 °F), were taken on a reconnaissance mission over the Bay of Lübeck by F-6 Mustang (the photo-reconnaissance version of the P-51) of the USAAF's 161st Tactical Reconnaissance Squadron around 1700 hrs, shortly after the attack.

On 4 May 1945, a British reconnaissance plane took photos of the two wrecks, Thielbek and Cap Arcona, the Bay of Neustadt being shallow. The capsized hulk of Cap Arcona later drifted ashore, and the beached wreck was finally broken up in 1949. For weeks after the attack, bodies of victims washed ashore, where they were collected and buried in mass graves at Neustadt in Holstein, Scharbeutz and Timmendorfer Strand. Parts of skeletons washed ashore over the next 30 years, with the last find in 1971.

The prisoners aboard the ships were of at least 30 nationalities: American, Belarusian, Belgian, Canadian, Czechoslovakian, Danish, Dutch, Estonian, Finnish, French, German, Greek, Hungarian, Italian, Latvian, Lithuanian, Luxembourger, Norwegian, Polish, Romanian, Russian, Serbian, Spanish, Swiss, Ukrainian, and possibly others.

Notable survivors

Francis Akos (1922–2016), born Weinman Akos Ferencz in Budapest, Hungary; Chicago Symphony Orchestra violinist
Heinrich Bertram (1897–1956), captain of Cap Arcona
Emil František Burian (1904–1959), musician and theatrical director, founder of Theatre D, a leading avant-garde theatre in inter-war Europe
Erwin Geschonneck (1906–2008), who later became a notable German actor, and whose story was made into a film in 1982
Ernst Goldenbaum (1898–1990), East German politician
Benjamin Jacobs (1919–2004) born Berek Jakubowicz in Dobra, Poland; dentist, Holocaust speaker and author
Philip Jackson (1928–2016), son of an American surgeon, Sumner Jackson, killed in the attacks
Hans van Ketwich Verschuur (1905-1995), Dutch Red Cross and Scouting official.
Heinz Lord (1917–1961), German-American surgeon
André Migdal (1924–2007), French resistant, Holocaust speaker and author, poet, survivor of Athen
Sam Pivnik (1926–2017), art dealer and lecturer on The Holocaust
Josef Štěrba (1905-1977), Czech politician
Gustaaf Van Essche (1923–1979), Belgian politician

Monuments and memorials

In popular culture

Typhoons' Last Storm, Lawrence Bond, 2000.
The Cap Arcona case, Günther Klaucke, Karl Hermann, 1995.
Der Mann von der Cap Arcona, GDR TV movie, Erwin Geschonneck's account of the sinking of Cap Arcona, 1981/82.
De ramp met de Cap Arcona, 2011.
Sonny Boy, Dutch film, 2011.
Nazi Titanic: Revealed, Channel 5 Documentary, 2012.
Mussche, Kirmen Uribe, 2012.

See also

Titanic (1943 film)
List of maritime disasters
List of maritime disasters in World War II
List of shipwrecks
List of sealed archives

References

Explanatory notes

Citations

General sources

In English

Non-English sources 
 Diercks, Herbert; Grill, Michael, Die Evakuierung des KZ Neuengamme und die Katastrophe am 3. Mai 1845 in der Lübecker Bucht. In : Kriegsende und Befreiung. Bremen 1995 
 Goguel, Rudi, Cap Arcona. Report über den Untergang der Häftlingsflotte in der Lübecker Bucht am 3. Mai 1945. Frankfurt/M 1972, 

 
 Lange, Wilhelm, Cap Arcona, Struves Buchdruckerei u. Verlag, Eutin 1988, 
 Lange, Wilhelm, Mythos und Wirklichkeit – Eine "publikumswirksame" Präsentation der Cap-Arcona-Katastrophe vom 3. Mai 1945, page 27, 2/2000, in Schiff und Zeit, Panorama maritim N° 52
 Lange, Wilhelm, Neueste Erkenntnisse zur Bombardierung der KZ Schiffe in der Neustädter Bucht am 3. Mai 1945: Vorgeschichte, Verlauf und Verantwortlichkeiten. In: Detlef Garbe: Häftlinge zwischen Vernichtung und Befreiung. Die Auflösung des KZ Neuengamme und seiner Außenlager durch die SS im Frühjahr 1945. Bremen 2005, 
 Orth, Karin, Planungen und Befehle der SS Führung zur Räumung des KZ-Systems. In: Detlef Garbe: Häftlinge zwischen Vernichtung und Befreiung. Die Auflösung des KZ Neuengamme und seiner Außenlager durch die SS im Frühjahr 1945. Bremen 2005, 
 Rothe, Claus, Deutsche Ozean-Passagierschiffe 1919–1985, VEB Verlag for Verkehrswesen Berlin 1987 transpress
 Schiffner, Sven, Cap-Arcona-Gedenken in der DDR: Gedenken, Volkssport, Propaganda. In: Garbe, Detlef and Lange, Carmen: Häftlinge zwischen Vernichtung und Befreiung. Bremen 2005
 Migdal, André, Les plages de sable rouge. La tragédie de Lübeck, 3 mai 1945. NM7 éditions, Paris 2001, .

External links

The Cap Arcona, the Thielbek and the Athen via Archive.org
Disaster on the Baltic Sea 
Inferno 
Appendix A 
Cap Arcona at Wrecksite
Lucien Revert 
Scuba diving around the wreck

 Images
Photo of Cap Arcona (1938)
Photos of Cap Arcona
Album photos
Die Tragödie in der Neustädter Bucht (The tragedy in the Bay of Neustadt) (1940–1945)
Photo of Cap Arcona (1945)
Photo of Cap Arcona (1949)
Postcard of the Memorial
 Cap Arcona, etching, Alfred Hrdlicka (1986)
 Drawing of the burning ships. Unknown artist.

 Videos
Launch of the liner Cap Arcona (Hamburg, 1927) + 1938. Video 
Titanic (1943) Part 8. Video 
Cap Arcona (1946). Video 
 YouTube
Nazi Titanic: Revealed, Channel 5 Documentary (United Kingdom, 2012)

1927 ships
1945 in Germany
Cruise ships of Germany
Deportation
Maritime incidents in 1932
Maritime incidents in May 1945
Massacres in Germany
Military scandals
Neuengamme concentration camp
Ocean liners
Prison ships
Ships built in Hamburg
Ships sunk by British aircraft
Steamships of Germany
The Holocaust in Germany
Troop ships of Germany
World War II passenger ships of Germany
World War II prisoner of war massacres
World War II shipwrecks in the Baltic Sea
Bay of Lübeck